The Port of Dover is a cross-channel ferry, cruise terminal, maritime cargo and marina facility situated in Dover, Kent, south-east England. This contrasts with the nearby Channel Tunnel, the only fixed link between the island of Great Britain and the European mainland, which now handles an estimated 20 million passengers and 1.6 million trucks per year.

The modern port facility features a large artificial harbour constructed behind stone piers and a defensive concrete breakwater. The port is divided into two main sections: the Eastern Docks serve as the main cross-channel ferry terminal, while the Western Docks contain a cruise ship terminal and a yacht marina along with cargo facilities.

The Port of Dover has a long history and possesses several listed buildings and structures. The port is owned and operated by the Dover Harbour Board, a statutory corporation formed by Royal Charter in 1606 by King James I. Most of the board members of the Dover Harbour Board are appointees of the Department for Transport. The port has its own private police force, the Port of Dover Police. The current port traffic volumes and urban population categorize Dover as a  Large-Port Town.

History

Recent archaeology indicates that Dover's history as a port and trading gateway dates back at least as far as the Stone and Bronze ages. Known as Dubris during the Roman occupation of Britain, the port has always enjoyed a significant strategic position due to its proximity to continental Europe and as the location of the sheltered River Dour estuary between two imposing chalk cliffs. The development of the port led directly to the growth of Dover as a settlement and, over many centuries, to the building of extensive defensive fortifications including Dover Castle and the Dover Western Heights. In the Roman era a walled town was built on the West Bank of the River Dour and the port grew into an important military, mercantile and cross-channel harbour. Dubris was one of the principal starting points of the Roman road later known as Watling Street.

Dover grew further after the Norman invasion of 1066 as a member of the Confederation of Cinque Ports. After the martyrdom of Archbishop Thomas Becket at Canterbury Cathedral in 1170, Dover flourished as the only designated port of entry for foreign pilgrims and as a point of departure for the Third and subsequent crusades. Following Edward III's success at the Battle of Sluys in 1340, a large defensive wall was built around the town. Although few concerted attempts to manage the shingle deposits blocking the harbour entrance were made during the late Middle Ages, a short pier and two defensive towers were constructed at the port in years immediately prior to Henry VIII's departure to the royal summit known as the Field of the Cloth of Gold in 1520.

In the 1580s, under the direction of Thomas Digges and championed by Sir Walter Raleigh, early port infrastructure work commenced to address siltation through the use of sluices and the development of an enclosed pool of water known as the Great Pent: by means of this the harbour could be periodically scoured. The Great Pent was formed by the construction of a cross wall across the existing natural shingle lagoon at the mouth of the River Dour: the work was largely undertaken by labourers from Romney Marsh, using skills honed in the construction of seawalls. The project has been described as "one of the most successful engineering enterprises of [Queen] Elizabeth's reign". The later construction of Wellington Dock, designed by James Walker in the early 1830s, occupies the approximate footprint of the Great Pent.

After the threats of the Napoleonic Wars at the beginning of the 19th century, the Admiralty selected Dover as the most suitable location of a harbour of refuge for the fleet between the dockyards of Chatham and Portsmouth. In 1847 construction began on the Admiralty Pier. Envisaged as the Western Arm of the proposed haven, completion of the massive first stage in 1871 effectively stopped the silting of the harbour mouth as it cut off the drift of shingle from the direction of Folkestone. The Admiralty Pier was constructed using a foundation of Portland Stone blocks surmounted by granite and durable Bramley Fall stone on the seaward facing exterior. Further construction from 1897 onwards established the Eastern Arm of the current harbour, the Southern Breakwater and a further extension of the Admiralty Pier.

Eastern Docks
Dover's Eastern Docks were used for ship breaking beginning during the First World War, when the Admiralty began dismantling ships there. The Stanlee Shipbreaking and Salvage Co. Ltd. took over the ship breaking operation commercially in 1920. Many of the ships broken up were naval vessels from the First World War. The company also handled machinery and general scrap, including the dismantling of the Dover Promenade Pier. The yard began to shrink after the Second World War and was closed in 1964 to make way for port redevelopment and a car ferry terminal.

From 1930 until 1950 an aerial ropeway carried coal from Tilmanstone colliery, 7½ miles to the north. It emerged halfway up the Langdon cliffs directly above the Eastern harbour arm, through two portals which have been bricked up but can still be seen from the ferry port. Coal was deposited in bunkers at the outer end of the Eastern harbour arm. The ropeway had 600 1-ton buckets that departed at intervals of 21 seconds and travelled at 4½ miles per hour. The system could thus transport 120 tons of coal per hour.

The first two roll-on/roll-off ferry berths in the Eastern Docks were opened on 30 June 1953.  The first ro-ro ferry, the appropriately modified British Railways' S.S.Dinard, departed for Boulogne on 3 July 1953. Today, there are 7 active docks for Ro-Ro vessels to utilise at Dover, one deconstructed dock and one unused dock for high-speed Ro-Ro watercraft.

In 1966 well over 600,000 accompanied vehicles travelled through Dover's Eastern Docks en route to France or Belgium.

Western Docks

After rail services were extended to Dover in 1844, the Western Docks were used as a terminal for the Golden Arrow and other cross-channel train services with its own railway station, Dover Marine, later renamed Dover Western Docks. At Dover Marine station an estimated 5 million troops departed for the trenches of the First World War and nearly 1.5 million wounded soldiers returned. In 1920 the remains of the Unknown Warrior were landed prior to transportation to London and a ceremonial interment at Westminster Abbey.  Dover Marine railway station closed in 1994, later to be redeveloped into Cruise Terminal One.

The Western Docks area was also used from 1968 to the early 2000s for a cross-channel hovercraft service run by Hoverspeed.  Hoverspeed also ran catamaran services until being declared bankrupt in 2005. Another catamaran service was run from 2004 until November 2008 by the single ship of SpeedFerries, SpeedOne, with up to five services daily to Boulogne-sur-Mer. The hoverport has now been demolished and redeveloped as a cargo handling facility.

Infrastructure

Eastern Docks

Cross channel ferry services to France operate from the seven twin-level ferry berths and associated departure buildings of the Eastern Docks.

Ferry services

The Eastern Docks also used to be served by the following, all now defunct:
MyFerryLink
LD Lines
SeaFrance
Norfolkline
Stena Line
P&O Stena Line
Townsend Thoresen
Normandy Ferries
Sealink (later Sealink Stena Line) and four companies under the tag:
Regie voor Maritiem Transport
Stoomvaart Maatschappij Zeeland
SNCF
British Rail

Western Docks
This part of the port is formed by the western arm of the harbour, Admiralty Pier, and its associated port facilities. Recently the focus of a £250 million port redevelopment project co-financed by the European Union.

Cruise ship terminal
Conversion and restoration of the historic former Dover Marine rail terminus, and the opening of a second, larger, cruise terminal building in 1996, have supported a significant expansion in cruise ship traffic. The cruise ship terminal can accommodate up to three ships at any one time.

In 2019 the Port of Dover accommodated 130 cruise ship port calls and over 200,000 passengers, making it the second busiest cruise ship port in the United Kingdom after the Port of Southampton.

Cargo handling
Dover Cargo Terminal West opened in December 2019, replacing berthing and handling facilities at the Eastern Docks. The new purpose-built cold chain and warehousing complex is capable of handling fresh produce, containers, project cargo, general cargo, breakbulk, grain and Roll-on/roll-off.

Marina
Marina facilities, primarily targeted at recreational sailing and power boating, are provided in both the historic Wellington Dock and adjacent to the cruise terminal and cargo wharves.

Access
 

In fiction
A boat train at Dover Western Harbour station is seen in the third episode of Inspector Morse, 'Deceived by Flight', which was filmed in 1989, prior to the station's closure in November 1994.

See also
France–UK border
Channel Ports
Port of Calais

References

Notes

Bibliography

External links
 Port of Dover official website
 Dover Ferries Forum 
 Dover Ferry Photos Website & Forum
 Dover Cruise Ships: Photos and Info

 
Buildings and structures in Dover, Kent
Port cities and towns of the North Sea
Juxtaposed border controls